Trevor Long is an American film, television and stage actor, best known for his recurring role as Cade Langmore on the Netflix TV series Ozark, as well as his role as former detective Sean Foster on the television series Low Winter Sun.

Early life 

Long was born in Poughkeepsie, New York and moved to Pittsburgh, Pennsylvania in second grade, graduating from Sewickley Academy in 1988. Long completed his Bachelor of Arts in acting at Brown University and his Masters of Fine Arts in Meisner acting at Rutgers University. He also trained with Harold Guskin.

Career

Film 

Long's notable film credits include Killing Them Softly, Don Juan DeMarco, and Jack Goes Boating. in 2018, he starred in Seeds, a horror film directed by his brother, Owen.

Stage 

Long has also been involved in numerous off-Broadway and other theater performances with the Huntington Theatre Company in Boston, the Manhattan Theatre Club, and the LAByrinth Theater Company in New York City, where he starred in a production of In Arabia We'd All Be Kings directed by Philip Seymour Hoffman.

Filmography

References

External links

Year of birth missing (living people)
Living people
American male television actors
People from Poughkeepsie, New York